The Hectorville Covered Bridge is a historic covered bridge in Montgomery, Vermont.  Originally located on Gibou Road off Vermont Route 118 in central Montgomery, the bridge is currently (2016) in storage.  It was built by Sheldon & Savannah Jewett, who are credited with building all of Montgomery's surviving 19th century covered bridges.  It was listed on the National Register of Historic Places in 1974.

Description and history
The bridge's exterior is clad in vertical board siding, and it is covered by a metal gable roof. The siding extends a short way into the portals to shelter the truss ends. The bridge decking consists of wooden planking on wooden stringers. When situated across the Trout River on Gibou Road, it sat on irregularly laid stone abutments faced in concrete.

The bridge's construction date is not known.  It is known to have been built by the town's Jewett brothers, who are credited with building Montgomery's other surviving covered bridges.  This assemblage is one of the most concentrated in Vermont all attributable to a single builder.  The Jewetts used standardized dimensions for their construction (except for the bridge length), and prepared wood for the bridges at their lumberyard in Montgomery's West Hill area.  The bridge was originally located in Montgomery Center, and was relocated to the Gibou Road location in the early 1900s.  As of 2003, the bridge was reported to be in a local construction yard, awaiting repairs and a determination by the town of where to place it.

See also
 
 
 
 
 List of covered bridges in Vermont
 National Register of Historic Places listings in Franklin County, Vermont
 List of bridges on the National Register of Historic Places in Vermont

References

Covered bridges on the National Register of Historic Places in Vermont
National Register of Historic Places in Franklin County, Vermont
Bridges completed in 1860
Covered bridges in Franklin County, Vermont
Buildings and structures in Montgomery, Vermont
Wooden bridges in Vermont
Lattice truss bridges in the United States
Road bridges in Vermont